The figure skating events at the 1972 Winter Olympics were held at the Makomanai Skating Rink and the Mikaho Indoor Skating Rink.

The results of both the men's and ladies' singles events were dominated by placements in the compulsory figures, which at the time were nominally worth 50% of the total score but in fact weighted more heavily than the free skating due to being judged using a wider range of marks.

In the men's event, Ondrej Nepela, the winner of the compulsory figures segment, took the gold in spite of placing only 4th in the free skating after falling on his triple loop jump. The free skating winner was Sergei Chetverukhin, who skated one of his best performances at this event to take the silver medal. Patrick Péra, second in the figures, had a poor free skating in which he fell on a triple salchow jump early in his program and then made other mistakes. Nonetheless, the weight given to figures allowed him to take the bronze medal ahead of John Misha Petkevich, Kenneth Shelley, and Toller Cranston, who all skated dynamic programs with at least one cleanly landed triple jump apiece.

The effect of the figures was even more pronounced in the ladies' competition, where gold medal winner Beatrix Schuba placed only 7th in the free skating, performing mostly single jumps. The free skating was won by Janet Lynn, who received a perfect mark of 6.0 despite falling on a flying sit spin. Lynn's skating captivated the Japanese audience, especially when she got up smiling from her fall. Lynn took the bronze while Karen Magnussen, second in the free skating with a strong performance, took the silver. The third place skater in the free skating, Sonja Morgenstern, included a triple salchow in her program, which at this time was very rare for a female skater. She placed 6th overall.

The pairs competition was a tight battle between the two top Russian teams. Irina Rodnina / Alexei Ulanov did not skate their best, with Ulanov missing his required double salchow jump in the short program and Rodnina making an error in the jump combination at the beginning of their free skating. They eventually won a 6–3 decision over their teammates Liudmila Smirnova / Andrei Suraikin. The bronze medal team of Manuela Groß / Uwe Kagelmann made no major errors and received the highest technical merit marks from some of the judges for their program. Their elements included a throw double axel which at this time was rarely attempted.

Medal table

Participating NOCs
Eighteen nations participated in figure skating at the 1972 Games.

Results

Men

Referee:
  Sonia Bianchetti

Assistant Referee:
  Masao Hasegawa

Judges:
  Monique Georgelin
  Helga von Wiecki
  Donald B. Cruikshank
  Mollie Phillips
  Walter Malek
  Emil Skákala
  Goro Ishimaru
  Dora May Coy
  Tatiana Danilenko
  Maria Zuchowicz (substitute)

Ladies

In the ladies' event, American skater Janet Lynn won not only a bronze medal, but also tremendous popularity among Japanese audiences because of her artistic free program, as to make appearance on the cover of "Olympic Winter Games, Sapporo 1972" photo books published in Japan, and even on Japanese TV commercials later.

Referee:
  Karl Enderlin

Assistant Referee:
  Kinuka Ueno

Judges:
  Michele Beltrami
  Valentin Piseev
  Walburga Grimm
  Ingegärd Lago
  Han Kutschera
  Joan MacLagan
  Marcella Willis
  Ryuchi Obitani
  Klára Kozári
  Pamela Davis (substitute)

Pairs

Referee:
  Elemér Terták

Assistant Referee:
  Donald H. Gilchrist

Judges:
  Valentin Piseev
  Joan MacLagan
  Walburga Grimm
  Maria Zuchowicz
  Marcella Willis
  Kikuko Minami
  Pamela Davis
  Erika Schiechtl
  Monique Georgelin
  Walter Malek (substitute)

References

External links
 Official Olympic Report
 results
 "XI Olympic Winter Games", Skating magazine, Apr 1972

 
1972 Winter Olympics events
1972
1972 in figure skating
International figure skating competitions hosted by Japan